Omicron Delta Kappa uses the term circle to indicate chapters. As of March 16, 2023, 429 circles have been chartered. Chapter that are active are indicated in bold; inactive chapters are indicated in italic. The practice of designating circles with Greek letter names was abandoned in 1949. Members who have died are said to have entered the Eternal Circle.

References

Omicron Delta Kappa
Omicron Delta Kappa